Radical 4 or radical slash meaning "slash" or "bend" is one of 6 of the 214  Kangxi radicals that are composed of only one stroke.

In the Kangxi Dictionary, there are 33 characters (out of 49,030) to be found under this radical.

It is highly similar to the Japanese katakana, no, thus colloquially referred to as "no" in Japanese.

 is also the 4th indexing component in the Table of Indexing Chinese Character Components predominantly adopted by Simplified Chinese dictionaries published in mainland China.

Evolution

Derived characters

In calligraphy

The only left-falling stroke in Radical 4, known as  piě, is basic to Chinese calligraphy. It has two different forms, 掠 lüè and zhuó, in the eight principles of 永 ( Yǒngzì Bāfǎ).

Literature

External links

Unihan Database - U+4E3F

004
004